This is a list of the main career statistics of professional Australian tennis player, Casey Dellacqua. To date, Dellacqua has won eight career doubles titles: one mixed doubles title, partnering with Scott Lipsky, at the 2011 French Open and seven WTA Tour doubles titles including one Premier Mandatory title with Yaroslava Shvedova at the 2015 Madrid Open. Other highlights of Dellacqua's career include reaching the doubles finals of all four grand slams; a quarterfinal finish in singles at the 2014 Indian Wells Open and fourth round appearances at the 2008 Australian Open, 2014 Australian Open, and US Open, respectively. Dellacqua achieved a career-high singles ranking of world No. 26 on September 29, 2014, and later achieved a career-high doubles ranking of No. 3 on February 1, 2016.

Significant finals

Grand Slam finals

Doubles: 7 (7 runner-ups)

Mixed doubles: 1 (title)

Premier Mandatory/Premier 5 finals

Doubles: 2 (1 title, 1 runner-up)

WTA career finals

Doubles: 20 (7 titles, 13 runner-ups)

ITF Circuit finals

Singles: 27 (22 titles, 5 runner-ups)

Doubles: 33 (23 titles, 10 runner-ups)

Grand Slam performance timelines

Singles

Doubles

Mixed doubles

Junior Grand Slam finals

Doubles: 1 (1 title)

Fed Cup participation

Singles: 11 (6–5)

Doubles: 17 (13–4)

Head-to-head statistics

Wins over top 10 ranked players

See also
 WTA Tour records
 Casey Dellacqua
 Australia Fed Cup team

References

Notes

Tennis career statistics